Abdal-Karim Khan   was Khan of Astrakhan from 1490 through 1504. For uncertainties and additional information see the second part of List of Astrakhan khans.

Khans of Astrakhan